Psi Boötis (ψ Boötis) is a single, orange-hued star in the northern constellation of Boötes. It is a dim star that is visible to the naked eye with an apparent visual magnitude of +4.55. Based upon an annual parallax shift of 13.26 mas as seen from the Earth, it is located about 246 light years from the Sun. At that distance, the visual magnitude is diminished by an extinction of 0.09 due to interstellar dust. It is traversing the sky with a net proper motion of 0.176 arc seconds per year, and has a radial velocity toward the Sun of −25.72 km/s.

This star has a stellar classification of K2 III,  matching an evolved K-type giant star. It belongs to the so-called "red clump", indicating that it is generating energy through helium fusion at its core. This star is about four billion years old and is spinning with a projected rotational velocity of 3.5 km/s. It has an estimated 1.38 times the mass of the Sun and has expanded to 20 times the Sun's radius. Psi Boötis radiating 135 times the Sun's luminosity from its enlarged photosphere at an effective temperature of 4,302 K.

Name
This star, according to Assemani, with another in the right arm that may have been ε Boo (Izar), constituted the Arabs' Al Aulād al Nadhlāt, which he rendered filii altercationis (sons of contention); but the original signifies "the Low, or Mean, Little Ones".

Al Aulād al Nadhlāt or Aulad al Nathlat was the title of this star in the catalogue of stars  in Technical Memorandum 33-507 - A Reduced Star Catalog Containing 537 Named Stars.

References

References
 
 

K-type giants
Horizontal-branch stars
Bootis, Psi
Boötes
Durchmusterung objects
Bootis, 43
133582
073745
5616